Param Dharam is a 1987 Indian Hindi-language film directed by Swaroop Kumar and produced by Dimpy, starring Mithun Chakraborty, Mandakini, Amrish Puri and Sumeet Saigal

Cast

Mithun Chakraborty as Vijay / Ravi (Double Role)
Mandakini as Bijli
Divya Rana as Munnibai
Moushumi Chatterjee as Savitri Singh
Navin Nischol as Thakur Prem Singh
Amrish Puri as Raja Shamsher Singh / Shamshera
Sumeet Saigal as Thakur Rajesh Singh
Satish Shah as Tolaram
Sudhir Dalvi as Thakur
Viju Khote as Jagga
Tiku Talsania as Tribal Head 
Dan Dhanoa as Shakti Singh
Gurbachan Singh as Shamshera's Goon
Rakesh Bedi
Prema Narayan as Parisienne Woman (Guest Appearance)

Soundtrack
Lyrics: Anjaan

References

External links

1987 films
1980s Hindi-language films
Films scored by Bappi Lahiri